The Hobie 18 is an American catamaran sailboat that was designed by Hobie Alter and Phil Edwards as a one design racer and first built in 1976.

Production
The design was built by Hobie Cat in the United States, starting in 1976, but it is now out of production.

Design

The Hobie 18 is a sailing dinghy, built predominantly of fiberglass. It has a fractional sloop rig, The twin hulls have raked stems, near-plumb transoms, twin transom-hung rudders controlled by a single tiller and twin retractable daggerboards. It displaces .

The design has a roller furling jib, internally-mounted halyards and adjustable mast spreaders to allow mast adjustments fore-and-aft and abeam while sailing.

Operational history
In 1980 America's Cup racer and media mogul Ted Turner was racing the Hobie 18 and said, "it's a terrific boat, why didn't they have these when I was growing up!"

See also
List of multihulls
List of sailing boat types

References

External links

Photo of a Hobie 18 Magnum, showing the hiking wings

Dinghies
Catamarans
1970s sailboat type designs
One-design sailing classes
Sailboat type designs by Hobie Alter
Sailboat type designs by Phil Edwards
Sailboat types built by Hobie Cat